Kweon Han-Jin (born May 19, 1988) is a South Korean football player who plays for Daejeon Hana Citizen FC.

Club statistics

References

External links
 
 J. League (#14)

1988 births
Living people
South Korean footballers
South Korean expatriate footballers
J1 League players
J2 League players
K League 1 players
Kashiwa Reysol players
Shonan Bellmare players
Thespakusatsu Gunma players
Roasso Kumamoto players
Jeju United FC players
Expatriate footballers in Japan
South Korean expatriate sportspeople in Japan
Association football defenders